Danny Mastrogiorgio (born October 26, 1964) is an American actor who has also provided voice work for video games. He is best known for providing the voice of Toni Cipriani in the 2005 video game Grand Theft Auto: Liberty City Stories and for his appearances in movies such as Brother Bear and Enchanted. He has also been in several television shows such as Law & Order.

Early life
Mastrogiorgio was born in Mount Vernon, New York. He studied for three years at College of Marin in California, before moving back to New York City to study at Juilliard School.

Career
Mastrogiorgio has appeared in television shows such as The Sopranos and Law & Order (in addition to two of the show's spinoffs, Law & Order: Special Victims Unit and Law & Order: Criminal Intent). Earlier in his career, he appeared in the TV mini-series based on the Mario Puzo novel, The Last Don and The Last Don II.

In addition to Liberty City Stories, Mastrogiorgio has provided his voice for many other projects. These include the video games Batman: Dark Tomorrow, The Sopranos: Road to Respect and Red Dead Redemption, and also the movies Brother Bear and Underdog.

In 2014, Mastrogiorgio  had a recurring role on Gotham as Frankie Carbone until his character was later killed off.

Theater
He has also appeared on stage in plays such as The Two Gentlemen of Verona at the New York Shakespeare Festival and The Taming of the Shrew at both the Denver Center for the Performing Arts and the Old Globe Theatre in San Diego. Among his more notable theater performances, the one-man show My Italy Story, written by Joseph Gallo, Mastrogiorgio stars as the entire DaGato clan.  In their review of the play, The New York Times wrote that the piece was "entertaining" and that as its star, Mastrogiorgio was "engaging".  Over its multi-year run, the play received other positive reviews as well, including those from Hartford Courant, Newsday, and New York Daily News.

Beginning February 2014, Mastrogiorgio will play the role of Paulie Pennino in Rocky the Musical.

Filmography

Film

Television

Video Games

Theatre

References

External links
 
 
 
 Danny Mastrogiorgio at Broadway.com

1964 births
Living people
Actors from Mount Vernon, New York
American male film actors
American male stage actors
American male television actors
American male video game actors
American male voice actors
Male actors from New York (state)
20th-century American male actors
21st-century American male actors